My Very Best is a compilation album by Agnetha Fältskog which was released on October 8, 2008. The album was released as a celebration of the 40 years anniversary of Agnetha's first hit single "Jag var så kär".

It was released in jewel case and digipack. CD 1 focused on her Swedish songs while CD 2 focused on her English songs.

The album debuted at #4 on the Swedish albums chart, and has been certified Gold in recognition of 20,000 copies sold.

Track list

Charts and certifications

Weekly charts

Certifications

References

2008 greatest hits albums
Agnetha Fältskog compilation albums